Zbigniew Klimowski (born 18 January 1967) is a Polish ski jumper. He competed in the large hill event at the 1992 Winter Olympics.

References

1967 births
Living people
Polish male ski jumpers
Olympic ski jumpers of Poland
Ski jumpers at the 1992 Winter Olympics
People from Nowy Targ
20th-century Polish people